Christmas Is may refer to:
 Christmas Is..., EP by Johnny Maestro & The Brooklyn Bridge
 "Christmas Is", song  by Francesca Battistelli from Christmas